The 2017 SABA Championship is the 6th SABA Championship, and the qualifying event in the SABA sub-zone, one of the FIBA Asia's subzone for the 2017 FIBA Asia Cup and 2019 FIBA Basketball World Cup Asian Qualifiers. The games were held from 19 to 23 May in Malé, Maldives. India successfully defended their SABA crown after sweeping the whole tournament. With this win, they qualified for the 2017 FIBA Asia Cup and the first round of the 2019 FIBA Basketball World Cup Asian Qualifiers. The tournament followed a single round robin format.

This tournaments marked the first time the Maldives hosted an international basketball tournament. Aside from the hosts, India, Sri Lanka, Nepal, and Bangladesh participated in the tournament.

Standings

Results
All times are in Maldivian Time (UTC+05:00)

Final rankings

References

2017
2017 in Maldivian sport
Basketball in the Maldives